The 2010 All-Ireland Colleges Camogie Championship was won by Loreto, Kilkenny, who defeated Blackwater CS, Lismore by 2–5 to 1–7 in the final on March 6, 2010, at Ardfinnan. Lismore's one point defeat in the final narrowly prevented a unique treble for the sport of Senior C, Senior B and Senior A titles in successive years.

Graded Competitions
There were graded competitions for colleges at three different levels. In the 2010 All Ireland Senior B final Colaiste Choilm, Ballincollig from Cork defeated Borris Vocational School from Carlow by 3–9 to 2–5, in Cahir. In the 2010 All Ireland Senior C final Presentation, Thurles defeated Banagher Community School by 3–18  to 1–1 in Toomevara.

Trophy
The trophy is the Corn Sceilge in honour of Seán Ó Ceallaigh (1872–1959) (known as Sceilg, an acronym of his name in ), one of the members of the Keating Branch of the Gaelic League that participated in the first Camogie matches in 1904. The shape of the cup is on the lines of the Ardagh Chalice.

Semi-finals
At the inter-provincial stages of the 2010 competition Blackwater CS, Lismore beat Portumna Community School 3–5 to 0–3 and Loreto, Kilkenny beat St. Patrick's College, Maghera 2–11 to 3-07 in the semi-finals. In the Senior B semi-finals Colaiste Choilm, Ballincollig defeated Holy Rosary, Mountbellew by 2–14 to 0–3. Borris VS, Carlow beat St Colm's, Draperstown 2–5 to 3-0 after Colm's led by three goals to two points at half time. In the Senior C semi-finals Presentation, Thurles beat Seamount, Kinvara 3–11 to 1–1 and Banagher CS defeated St Louis, Kilkeel 5–6 to 4–6 in a replay after drawing 3–4 to 2–7.

2010 Final

 MATCH RULES
60 minutes
Extra Time if scores level
Maximum of 5 substitutions

References

External links
 Official Camogie Website

All-Ireland Colleges Camogie Championship
All-Ireland Colleges Camogie Championship